Al-Tahra Palace is a palace located in the Hadaek al-Qubbah district in Cairo, Egypt. It was built in the early 20th Century and designed by Antonio Lasciac. It was mainly built for Princess Amina, daughter of Khedive Ismail and mother of Mohamed Taher Pasha. It was built in "Italianate Palazzo" style.

References 

Palaces in Cairo
Muhammad Ali dynasty
Antonio Lasciac buildings